In enzymology, a methionyl-tRNA formyltransferase is an enzyme that catalyzes the chemical reaction

10-formyltetrahydrofolate + L-methionyl-tRNAfMet + H2O  tetrahydrofolate + N-formylmethionyl-tRNAfMet

This enzyme belongs to the family of transferases that transfer one-carbon groups, specifically the hydroxymethyl-, formyl- and related transferases.  The systematic name of this enzyme class is 10-formyltetrahydrofolate:L-methionyl-tRNA N-formyltransferase. Other names in common use include N10-formyltetrahydrofolic-methionyl-transfer ribonucleic, transformylase, formylmethionyl-transfer ribonucleic synthetase, methionyl ribonucleic formyltransferase, methionyl-tRNA Met formyltransferase, methionyl-tRNA transformylase, methionyl-transfer RNA transformylase, methionyl-transfer ribonucleate methyltransferase, and methionyl-transfer ribonucleic transformylase.  This enzyme participates in 3 metabolic pathways: methionine metabolism, one carbon pool by folate, and aminoacyl-tRNA biosynthesis.

Structural studies

References

 

EC 2.1.2
Enzymes of known structure